A number of different units of measurement were used in Chile to measure quantities like length, mass, area, capacity, etc.  From 1848, the metric system has been compulsory in Chile.

Pre-metric units

Spanish customary units were used before 1848.

Length

To measure length several units were used.  Legally, one vara is equal to 0.836 m. Some of the units and their legal values as follows:  

 1 línea =  vara
 1 pulgada =  vara
 1 pie =  vara
 1 cuadra = 150 vara
 1 legua = 5400 vara

Mass

Several units were used to measure mass.  One libra is equal to 0.460093 kg. Some other units are given below:

 1 grano =  libra
 1 adarme =  libra
 1  =  libra
 1 onza =  libra
 1 arroba = 25 libra
 1 quintal = 100 libra

Capacity

Mainly two systems, dry and liquid, were used to measure capacity in Chile.

Dry

One almud was equal to 8.083 L.  12 almud were equal to one fanega.

Liquid

One cuartillo was equal to 1.111 L. 32 cuartillo were equal to one arroba.

References

Chilean culture
Chile